, also sometimes known as Sword Art Online: Code Resister, is a 2014 video game for iOS and Android devices released in Japan only.

Gameplay 
Sword Art Online: Code Register is a Japanese role-playing game with a simple tap-and-play battle system. Players can put together groups of characters with different skills and actions to take on opponents and explore different worlds. The game features multiple worlds and characters featured in the franchise, including the eponymous Sword Art Online, ALfheim Online, and Gun Gale Online, as well as its own original characters.

The game features a "Duel Order System" where players tap characters to make them perform actions against enemies and thus pull of combos, and utilize the "Switch" system to change the order of attack for better strategies and combos. Similar to the light novel and anime, there exists different kinds of Sword Skills and Unit Skills which players can utilize to deal damage or recover health; with using these different skills and combos being the key to winning the game. There also exists systems to create custom weapons using materials gathered from quests, levelling up skills, and adding abilities.

Promotion 
Players who register early can obtain a special Kirito avatar. A pre-release promotion by Bandai Namco allows registered users to help decide the voice actress for the new original character Sayuki. They are also entered into a lottery where the winner receives a Leafa figure.

Sword Art Online: Code Register featured in a 2015 crossover collaboration with the Tales franchise, with characters from Tales of Link making their way into the game, along with various events and illustrations. "Snow White of Saintly Healing Asuna" and "Gluttonous Reindeer Silica" outfits were available in December 2015 as part of a Christmas promotion, after "Lovely Bride Asuna" and "Pretty Bride Silica" designs in June.

Another 2016 crossover effort features Cross Register and .hack mobile game New World, with Code Register receiving a Black Rose costume and New World receiving Kirito and Asuna costumes and a Yui accessory, amongst other character and equipment cards.

Reception 
Geoff Thew of Hardcore Gamer complained about the lack of meaningful user interaction, claiming it "looks as exciting as data entry."

References

External links 
 

2014 video games
IOS games
Android (operating system) games
Role-playing video games
Science fantasy video games
Science fiction video games
Code Register
Video games developed in Japan